Döbereiner is a surname. Notable people with the surname include:

 Johann Wolfgang Döbereiner (1780–1849), German chemist
 Johanna Döbereiner (1924–2000), Brazilian agronomist

German-language surnames